Robert Normandeau (born March 11, 1955) is a Canadian electroacoustic music composer.

Born in Quebec City, Quebec, Normandeau studied at the Université Laval in Quebec City, and at the Université de Montréal, where he studied with Marcelle Deschênes and Francis Dhomont. He currently resides in Montreal, where he was appointed Professor of Electroacoustic Music Composition in 1999. With the release of Puzzles (empreintes DIGITALes, IMED 0575, 2005) he was the first on the label to embrace the short-lived high-quality if impractical DVD Audio format.

Recordings
 Puzzles (empreintes DIGITALes, IMED 0575, 2005)
 Clair de terre (empreintes DIGITALes, IMED 0157, 2001)
 Sonars (Rephlex, CAT 116, 2001)
 Figures (empreintes DIGITALes, IMED 9944, 1999)
 Tangram (empreintes DIGITALes, IMED 9920, 1999)
 Lieux inouïs (empreintes DIGITALes, IMED 9802, 1998)
 Le petit prince d'Antoine de Saint-Exupéry (Radio-Canada, MVCD 1091, 1996)
 Tangram (empreintes DIGITALes, IMED 9419/20, 1994)
 Lieux inouïs (empreintes DIGITALes, IMED 9002, 1990)
 Normandeau, Spangiafora et al. Sonic Circuits 5 (Innova 114)

List of works
 Bédé (1990)
 Le cap de la tourmente (1984–1985)
 La chambre blanche (1985–1986)
 Chat noir (1995)
 Chorus (2002), 16-track tape
 Clair de terre (1999)
 Convergence Radio (1989)
 Éclats de voix (1991)
 Éden (2003), 16-track tape
 Électre suite (2000)
 Ellipse (1999)
 L'envers du temps (1998, 2000), guitar, and tape
 Erinyes (2001)
 Erinyes pour Lucie (2005), interactive system; choreography by Lucie Grégoire
 Figures de rhétorique (1997), tape, and piano
 The Flautist (2001)
 Fragments (1992)
 Hamlet-Machine with Actors (2003), 16-track tape
 Jeu (1989)
 Jeu blanc (2001), tape, and flute
 Kuppel (2006)
 Malina (2000)
 Matériau pour Médée (2005)
 Matrechka (1986)
 Mémoires vives (1989)
 Musique holographique (1984–1985)
 Palimpseste (2005, 06)
 Palindrome (2005–2006)
 Le petit prince (1994)
 Puzzle (2003), 16-track tape
 Le renard et la rose (1995)
 Rumeurs (Place de Ransbeck) (1987)
 Spleen (1993)
 StrinGDberg (2001–2003), 16-track tape
 Tangram (1992)
 Tropes (1991)
 Venture (1998)

References

Further reading
 Paland, Ralph. “In akusmatischer Nacht: Elektroakustische Proust-Bilder franko-kanadischer Komponisten im poetologischen Kontext der Musique acousmatique.” In Marcel Proust und die Musik: Beiträge des Symposions der Marcel Proust Gesellschaft in Wien im November 2009, edited by Albert Gier, 233–84. Berlin: Insel Verlag, 2012. .
Steenhuisen, Paul.  "Interview with Robert Normandeau".  In Sonic Mosaics: Conversations with Composers. Edmonton: University of Alberta Press, 2009.  .

External links
 Biography on electrocd.com
 Ogborn, David. “Interview with Robert Normandeau.” eContact! 11.2 — Figures canadiennes (2) / Canadian Figures (2) (July 2009). Montréal: CEC.

1955 births
Canadian composers
Canadian male composers
French Quebecers
Electroacoustic music composers
Living people
Musicians from Quebec City